The Thompson Store is a property in Duplex, Tennessee that was listed on the National Register of Historic Places (NRHP) in 1988. and delisted in 2009.

In a 1988 study of historic resources in the county, the Thompson Store was evaluated to be one of the "two best remaining store buildings from the early 20th century" besides in the city of Franklin (along with the Huff Store at Burwood, Tennessee, also NRHP-listed).

References

Commercial buildings on the National Register of Historic Places in Tennessee
Buildings and structures in Williamson County, Tennessee
Commercial buildings completed in 1890
National Register of Historic Places in Williamson County, Tennessee

Former National Register of Historic Places in Tennessee